Euarne is a genus of moths of the family Yponomeutidae. It is named after Euarne, one of Hesiod's 50 Nereids (Hesiod, Theogony, Paragraph 240).

Species
Euarne obligatella - Möschler, 1890 

Yponomeutidae